Neottia smithiana is a species of flowering plant in the family Orchidaceae. It is endemic to China.

References

Endemic orchids of China
smithiana
Endangered plants
Taxonomy articles created by Polbot